The McDonnell Douglas Helicopter Systems MD 500 Defender is a light multi-role military helicopter based on the MD 500 light utility helicopter and OH-6 Cayuse Light Observation Helicopter.

Design and development
The original OH-6 Cayuse helicopter proved its worth during the Vietnam War in the light helicopter role. The designers at Hughes realized there was a market for a light multi-mission helicopter with an improved equipment fit than the OH-6 and Model 500M. The resulting design was the Model 500MD Defender which first flew in 1976. It was tailored for specific roles including unarmed observation and an armed scout helicopter equipped with TOW anti-tank missiles. An anti-submarine version was developed with a search radar, magnetic anomaly detector and the capability to carry lightweight aerial torpedoes.

The helicopter was popular with customers like Kenya who could buy a capable anti-armor helicopter for less than half the cost of a gunship such as the AH-1 Cobra or the AH-64 Apache. Israel used the Defender extensively during the conflicts of the late 1970s and 1980s against Syrian armored forces.

The Defender was later built as an improved version as the MD530MG, with increased engine power, handling, avionics, and a redesigned forward fuselage. Later developments included a mast mounted sight (MMS).

In December 2012, Boeing demonstrated their Unmanned Little Bird to the South Korean Army.  The pilotless aircraft flew autonomously in a 25-minute demonstration for the purpose of showing unmanned capabilities technologies, such as enhanced ISR and resupply, in the system that could be integrated into Army MD 500 helicopters. In October 2015, Korean Air Aerospace Division (KAL-ASD) unveiled a mock-up of their unmanned MD 500, designated the Korean Air Unmanned System-Vertical Helicopter (KUS-VH), featuring blacked out windows, a large fuel tank where the rear seats would be that extends endurance to four hours, and an armament of two Hellfire missiles and a 2.75 in (70 mm) rocket pod; unlike Boeing's optionally manned and unarmed ULB, the KUS-VH is completely unmanned and armed as well as having an EO/IR sensor.  The KUS-VH is envisioned to perform missions including ISR, attack, aerial delivery, coast guard, amphibious landing support, and emergency reinforcement to back up manned helicopter units.  A KUS-VH unit would consist of two to four aircraft and sensor packages, a ground control system and ground support system, and it could operate alone or in conjunction with manned attack helicopters.  A request for proposals for an unmanned scout helicopter is expected in 2016-2017, for which the company says making the up to 175 MD 500s unmanned would be a cheap way of reusing them after retirement from service over the next 10 years for safely performing dangerous attack missions.

MD Helicopters had submitted a version called the MD 540F in the U.S. Army's Armed Aerial Scout program. This caused Boeing to try to block MD Helicopters from participating, citing agreements the companies struck in 2005 to offer the Mission Enhanced Little Bird in the Armed Reconnaissance Helicopter program.  As part of the venture, MD Helicopters sold intellectual property related to the aircraft's design. The two companies lost the bid and the program was ultimately cancelled. When MD Helicopters disclosed plans to offer the MD 540F in the AAS program in April 2012, Boeing claimed that they could not sell any "similarly configured" aircraft to any U.S. or foreign military organization. Boeing offered their AH-6 in the competition.  MD Helicopters said Boeing did not object to previous sales to armed forces and governments in Japan, Jordan, and Italy, as well as to U.S. special operations, and local U.S. police forces. Restrictions on selling aircraft similar to the Little Bird, domestically or to foreign users, would have put the company out of business. In July 2013, a federal court ruled that MD Helicopters could not be blocked from offering their aircraft. The Army ended the AAS program in late 2013.

Variants
500D Scout Defender
Armed reconnaissance version
500M Defender
Military export version of the 500 and 500C, built under license by Kawasaki in Japan (as the OH-6J) and Breda Nardi in Italy.
500M/ASW Defender
Export version for the Spanish Navy.
NH-500E built under license by Breda Nardi (Agusta) since 1990
NH-500M Defender
Italian-built version of the 500M Defender. Licensed by Breda Nardi before merge with Agusta.
500MD Defender
Military version of the 500D. Korean Air's aerospace division from 1976 to 1984 with 200 choppers made. 50 were armed with TOW anti-tank missiles and 150 choppers used for transportation and support duties.

500MD/ASW Defender
Maritime version of the 500MD Defender. Equipped with a Bendix RDR-1300 search radar in a nose cone offset to the port side, and a towed ASQ-81C(V)2 magnetic anomaly detector (MAD) at the starboard fuselage. Up to two Mk 44 or Mk 46 torpedoes are carried underneath the fuselage, which can be replaced by smoke markers.
500MD/TOW Defender
Anti-tank version of the 500MD Defender, armed with TOW anti-tank missiles.
500MD/MMS-TOW Defender
Anti-tank version, fitted with a mast-mounted sight, armed with TOW anti-tank missiles.
500MD Quiet Advanced Scout Defender
Fitted with noise suppression equipment.
500MD Defender II
Improved version.
500MG Defender
Military version of the 500E.
520MG Defender
Philippine military version.  Special Forces version. Modified 500MG Defender that carries .50 (12.7 mm) caliber machine guns and 7-tube rocket pods and operates as a light attack aircraft.
520MK Black Tiger
South Korean-built military version, built by Korean Air Aerospace Division
MD 530F Cayuse Warrior
It is a military light scout attack helicopter developed from OH-6 Cayuse. It incorporating simple fixed-forward sighting system, FN Herstal weapons management system, Rohde & Schwarz M3AR tactical mission radio and Dillon Aero mission configurable armament system (MCAS) weapons plank.   
Weapons: Two hardpoints for FN HMP400 gun pod with FN M3P .50 BMG (12.7 mm) heavy machine gun (1100 rpm firing rate, carries 400 rounds ammo, effective firing range nearly 1,850 m, maximum firing range 6500 m) and/or M260 rocket pod with 7 unguided Hydra 70 rockets (effective firing range 8 km).
Afghanistan Air Force is the largest operator of MD 530F Cayuse Warrior.
MD 530M 
Military version.
MD 530MG Defender
Military version.
MD 530G BII
Improved military version
MD530 Nightfox
Night attack version.
MD530MG Paramilitary Defender
Police or border patrol version.
MD540F
Upgraded MD530F, incorporating a 6-bladed, fully articulated rotor blade system made of composite material, a more rugged landing skid for heavier take-off and landing weights, a fully integrated digital glass cockpit with multi-function color displays and a pilot Helmet Display and Tracking System (HDTS), which couples together a targeting FLIR and laser designator.
MD530G
Designed based on the MD530F airframe and is engineered with advanced technology to deliver enhanced combat capabilities.

Operators
For civilian operators, see MD 500 series'''.

Military operators

 Argentine Air Force

 Chilean Army

 Colombian Air Force

 Air Force of El Salvador

 Finnish Army

Italian Air Force

See Hughes OH-6

Kenya Defence Forces

Republic of Korea Air Force
Republic of Korea Army

 Lebanese Air Force

 Malaysian Army

 Mexican Air Force

 Servicio Nacional Aeronaval

 Philippine Air Force

 Republic of China Navy

United States Army (See A/MH-6)

Former operators

Afghan Air Force

 Argentine Coast Guard

Croatian Air Force

Guinean Air Force

 Israeli Air Force

Specifications (500M)

See also

References

External links

MD Helicopters - MD530G
 MD 500 Defender page on GlobalSecurity.org
 IDF Defenders in action

1970s United States helicopters
United States military helicopters
Single-turbine helicopters
Aircraft first flown in 1976
500 Defender

pt:MD 520 Notar